The 1989 Indianapolis Colts season was the 37th season for the team in the National Football League and sixth in Indianapolis. The Indianapolis Colts finished the National Football League's 1989 season with a record of 8 wins and 8 losses, and finished tied for second in the AFC East division with the Miami Dolphins. However, the Colts finished ahead of Miami based on better conference record (7–5 vs. Dolphins' 6–8).

Personnel

Staff

Roster

Regular season

Schedule

Standings

Awards and records 
 Clarence Verdin, AFC Kickoff Return Leader

See also 
 History of the Indianapolis Colts
 List of Indianapolis Colts seasons
 Colts–Patriots rivalry

References 

Indianapolis Colts
Indianapolis Colts seasons
Baltimore